The 1991–92 NBA season was the Nets' 25th season in the National Basketball Association, and 16th season in East Rutherford, New Jersey. The Nets selected point guard Kenny Anderson out of Georgia Tech with the second overall pick in the 1991 NBA draft. However, Anderson held out early due to a contract dispute, and Roy Hinson would miss the entire season with a knee injury, as the Nets struggled losing 11 of their first 13 games. After a 7–18 start, the team managed to win nine of their next twelve games, and held a 19–28 record at the All-Star break. The Nets finished third in the Atlantic Division with a 40–42 record.

Dražen Petrović led the team in scoring averaging 20.6 points per game, and finished in second place in Most Improved Player voting, while second-year star Derrick Coleman averaged 19.8 points, 9.5 rebounds and 1.5 blocks per game, and Sam Bowie provided the team with 15.0 points, 8.1 rebounds and 1.7 blocks per game. In addition, Mookie Blaylock contributed 13.8 points, 6.8 assists and 2.4 steals per game, while Chris Morris provided with 11.4 points, 6.4 rebounds and 1.7 steals per game, second-year forward Terry Mills averaged 9.0 points and 5.5 rebounds per game off the bench, and Chris Dudley led the team with 9.0 rebounds and 2.2 blocks per game. Anderson averaged 7.0 points and 3.2 assists per game off the bench as backup point guard for Blaylock.

The club qualified for the playoffs, but were eliminated in the Eastern Conference First Round by the Cleveland Cavaliers in four games. Following the season, Blaylock and Hinson were both traded to the Atlanta Hawks, while Mills signed as a free agent with the Detroit Pistons, and head coach Bill Fitch resigned after clashing with his young stars.

For the season, the team added new darker blue road uniforms, replacing the light blue road jerseys from the previous season. These uniforms would remain in use until 1997.

Draft picks

Roster

Roster notes
 Power forward Roy Hinson missed the entire season due to a knee injury.

Regular season

Season standings

y – clinched division title
x – clinched playoff spot

z – clinched division title
y – clinched division title
x – clinched playoff spot

Record vs. opponents

Game log

Playoffs

|- align="center" bgcolor="#ffcccc"
| 1
| April 23
| @ Cleveland
| L 113–120
| Dražen Petrović (40)
| Derrick Coleman (11)
| Derrick Coleman (9)
| Richfield Coliseum16,512
| 0–1
|- align="center" bgcolor="#ffcccc"
| 2
| April 25
| @ Cleveland
| L 96–118
| Derrick Coleman (24)
| Derrick Coleman (9)
| Mookie Blaylock (6)
| Richfield Coliseum20,273
| 0–2
|- align="center" bgcolor="#ccffcc"
| 3
| April 28
| Cleveland
| W 109–104
| Chris Morris (28)
| Derrick Coleman (11)
| Mookie Blaylock (12)
| Brendan Byrne Arena15,258
| 1–2
|- align="center" bgcolor="#ffcccc"
| 4
| April 30
| Cleveland
| L 89–98
| Coleman, Morris (22)
| Derrick Coleman (14)
| Derrick Coleman (6)
| Brendan Byrne Arena13,071
| 1–3

Player statistics

Season

Playoffs

Player Statistics Citation:

Awards and records

Transactions

References

 New Jersey Nets on Database Basketball
 New Jersey Nets on Basketball Reference

New Jersey Nets season
New Jersey Nets seasons
New Jersey Nets
New Jersey Nets
20th century in East Rutherford, New Jersey
Meadowlands Sports Complex